For the Summer Olympics, there are 53 venues that have or will be used for equestrian. From 1912 to 1992, the events took place in more than one venue. Since the 1992 Summer Olympics, the equestrian events have taken place on a single venue in an effort to reduce costs. During the 1964 to the 1980 Summer Olympics, an equestrian event was the final event before the closing ceremonies of the respective Olympics. The last equestrian event that took place at the main stadium was at the 1988 Summer Olympics though it was not the final event before the closing ceremonies. That honor would fall for the end of the men's marathon event. Stockholm Olympic Stadium is the only equestrian venue to serve host for more than one Summer Olympics, doing so in 1912 and 1956.

References

Venues
 
Equ